Robert Wagtskjold  is a Norwegian handball player.

He made his debut on the Norwegian national team in 1970, 
and played 7 matches for the national team between 1970 and 1971. He participated at the 1970 World Men's Handball Championship.

References

Year of birth missing (living people)
Living people
Norwegian male handball players